Prenzler is a German surname. Notable people with the surname include:

Olaf Prenzler (born 1958), East German sprinter
Peter Prenzler (born 1952), Australian politician

German-language surnames